Izumi is both a Japanese given name and a surname. It may also refer to:

Places in Japan 
Izumi, Osaka, a city on the island of Honshu
Izumi, Kagoshima, a city on the island of Kyushu
, a suburb in the Suginami ward of Tokyo 
Izumi, Kumamoto, a village located in Yatsuhiro District
Izumi-ku, Sendai, the northernmost ward of Sendai

Former entities 
Izumi Province, a former province whose area now makes up the southwestern part of Osaka Prefecture
Izumi Domain, a feudal domain under the Tokugawa shogunate of the Edo period, located in southern Mutsu Province

See also
6089 Izumi, asteroid
Izumi Todo, collective pseudonym of the staff of Toei Animation
Japanese cruiser Izumi, warship formerly named Esmeralda